Tournoisis is a commune in the Loiret department, Centre-Val de Loire region, north-central France.

See also
Communes of the Loiret department

References

Communes of Loiret